The Dammersfeld  Ridge is a low mountain chain in the High Rhön in Germany, which begins on a line from Bischofsheim to Gersfeld and runs in a southwesterly direction to Riedenberg – Werberg – Maria Ehrenberg. The majority of this area today is a military out-of-bounds area, the Wildflecken Training Area. Its highest point is the Dammersfeldkuppe, the second-highest mountain in the Rhön. The Bavarian-Hessian state border runs along the crest of the mountain chain.

Natural regions 
The Dammersfeld Ridge was first defined in 1968 as a natural region as part of the natural regional classification of Germany at a map scale of 1:200,000 (Sheet 140 Schweinfurt), and it is grouped as follows:
(part of no. 35 East Hesse Highlands)
(part of no. 354 High Rhön)
(part of no. 354.0 Southern High Rhön)
354.00 Dammersfeld Ridge

Mountains 
 Dammersfeldkuppe (northwest of Wildflecken, in the southwest of the area)
 Dreifeldskuppe (west-northwest summit)
  (northern summit)
 Bremerkopf 
  (north-northwestern summit)
 Eierhauckberg
 Beilstein (west-southwestern summit)
 Hohe Hölle
 Himmeldunkberg (southern summit)
  (southwestern summit)
 Mittelberg (almost a northeastern spur of the Eierhauckberg)
 Schachen (eastern summit)
 Rommerser Berg (northern summit)
 Zornberg (southern summit)
 Rückberg (almost a southern spur of the Dammersfeldkuppe)
 
  (with the )
 Großer Auersberg
 Kleiner Auersberg
 Ehrenberg

References 

Mountain ranges of Bavaria
Mountain ranges of Hesse
Rhön Mountains
Natural regions of the East Hesse Highlands
Rhön-Grabfeld
Bad Kissingen (district)
Fulda (district)